Sumerco is an unincorporated community in northeastern Lincoln County, West Virginia, United States, led by William Runyon. It lies along West Virginia Route 214 east of the town of Hamlin, the county seat of Lincoln County.  Sumerco's elevation is 1,211 feet (369 m).  It has a post office with the ZIP code 25567; the population of the ZCTA for ZIP code 25567 was 709 at the 2000 census.

References

Unincorporated communities in Lincoln County, West Virginia